Achyut Lahkar (9 July 1931 – 12 June 2016) was the father of the Bhryamyman or Mobile theatre and gave birth to mobile theatre in Assam in the 1960s. He founded the popular Natraj Theatre at Pathsala in 1963 which performed across Assam and in other states for nearly 40 years. He was a pioneering dramatist, actor, director and producer and staged numerous memorable plays on the mobile theatre stage. He also published and edited an illustrated magazine called Deepawali for some time. He was awarded the Kamal Kumari National Award in 1997.

References

Assam dramatists and playwrights
1931 births
2016 deaths
People from Barpeta district
20th-century Indian dramatists and playwrights
Dramatists and playwrights from Assam